Niels Kuster (born June 19, 1957, in Olten, Switzerland) is a Swiss electrical engineer and Professor. The focus of his research is on the electromagnetic near field, basics for assessing/using the interaction of electromagnetic fields with organisms, and physiological simulations as part of biophysics.

Early life and education 
Kuster grew up in Olten, in the Swiss Canton of Solothurn, where he attended elementary and middle school. After graduating from Gymnasium with the "Matura Type C" (concentration in mathematics and physical sciences) diploma, he studied at the ETH Zurich and graduated in 1984 with a degree in electrical engineering. Starting in 1985, he pursued doctoral work in the Laboratory for Field Theory and Microwave Technology (IFH) at the ETH Zurich under the direction of Heinrich Baggenstos, during which time he was a teaching and research assistant. He defended his doctoral dissertation, entitled "Dosimetric assessment of EM sources near biological bodies by computer simulations", in 1992.

Career 
During his post-doctoral studies at IFH in 1992, Prof. Kuster also worked at the Electromagnetics Laboratory of Motorola Inc in Fort Lauderdale, Florida. In 1993, Kuster was then appointed assistant professor in the Department of Information Technology and Electrical Engineering (D-ITET) at the ETH Zurich. Kuster co-founded Schmid and Partners Engineering AG (SPEAG) in December 1994 as a spin-off company of the ETH-Zurich, together with Thomas Schmid, Kurt Schmid, Martin Schmid, Oliver Egger, and Klaus Meier, with the main objective to further develop and commercialize the Dosimetric Assessment SYstem (DASY), the first electromagnetic near-field scanner optimized for testing the compliance of mobile communications devices with safety limits. In 1998, he was a visiting professor and lecturer at the Tokyo Metropolitan University in Japan. In 1999, he founded the Swiss non-profit Foundation for Research on Information Technology in Society (IT'IS) and relocated his research group there to be able to react more flexibly to research problems concerning human exposure to electromagnetic radiation. Kuster founded ZMT Zurich MedTech AG (ZMT) in 2006 as a spin-off company of the ETH-Zurich and the IT'IS Foundation. Between 2000 and 2021, he has been able to acquire more than CHF 100 million in 3rd-party funding. He has been an adjunct professor at the ETH Zurich since 2001 and headed the BioElectromagnetics research group of the ETH's Laboratory for Integrated Systems. His main achievements are in the areas of measurement and simulation methods in the electromagnetic near field, safety aspects of wireless communication and magnetic resonance imaging, virtual human and animal models for investigations of anatomy-dependent interactions and optimization of therapies via computer simulation (e.g., in silico clinical trials and neurostimulation).

Participation in start-up companies 
Kuster has been involved in the founding of several start-up companies:

 1994: Schmid & Partner Engineering AG (SPEAG) together with Thomas Schmid, Kurt Schmid, Martin Schmid, Oliver Egger, and Klaus Meier
 1999: MaxWave AG, co-founder
 2006: ZMT Zurich MedTech AG, co-founder with the IT'IS team for medical research
 2011: Thessaloniki Software Solutions S.A. (THESS), co-founder
 2011: BNNSPEAG, a joint venture between SPEAG and the Indian company BNN Communication Engineers
 2011: SCALK, a joint venture between SPEAG and the South Korean company Dymstec Co., Ltd
 2019: TI Solutions AG,

Other activities 

 Consultant to government agencies on safety issues related to wireless devices
 Member of professional societies such as the Bioelectromagnetics Society (BEMS), the European Society of Hyperthermic Oncology (ESHO), the Society for Thermal Medicine (STM), the Society for Neuroscience (SfN), and the Swiss Society for Neuroscience (SSN).
 Associate Editor of the IEEE Transactions on Electromagnetic Compatibility
 Participation in international standards committees, including the International Electrotechnical Commission (IEC) Technical Committee (TC) 106,  TC 61, and the International Organization for Standardization (ISO) TS 10974:2018

Awards and honors 

 2011: IEEE Fellow: Laudatio: For contributions to the area of near-field exposures and dosimetry for radiofrequency fields in biomedical research
 2012: d'Arsonval Award, the highest award of the Bioelectromagnetics Society
 2014: Institute of Electronics, Information, and Communication Engineers (IEICE) Senior Member

References

External links 
 

1957 births
Living people
Swiss electrical engineers